Eoophyla citrialis is a moth in the family Crambidae. It was described by David John Lawrence Agassiz in 2012. It is found in Tanzania, where it has been recorded from the Eastern Arc Mountains.

The wingspan is 14–16 mm. The forewings are white with an indistinct yellowish median fascia and a yellow terminal area. The base of the hindwings is white.

Etymology
The species name refers to the predominant colour of the species and is derived from Greek kitria (meaning lemon).

References

Eoophyla
Moths described in 2012